Welcome to Chechnya is a 2020 documentary film by American reporter, author and documentarian David France. The film centers on the anti-gay purges in Chechnya of the late 2010s, filming LGBT Chechen refugees using hidden cameras as they made their way out of Russia through a network of safehouses aided by activists.

It had its world premiere at the Sundance Film Festival on January 26, 2020 and was released on June 30, 2020, by HBO Films.

Production
The film follows the work of activists rescuing survivors of torture in Chechnya. To avoid exposing their work, it was shot in secret, using hidden cameras, cell phones, GoPros, and handycams.

Further complicating the production of the film was the need to protect the identities of interviewees. France wanted to put a real human face on the story, so conventional techniques of disguising one's appearance, such as blurring their faces, filming them in darkness or hiring actors to stage re-enactments were not enough. Eventually he opted for advanced facial replacement techniques using artificial intelligence and novel visual effects technology so the viewer could see real faces displaying real emotions while still protecting the identities of the speakers. The approach is a "game changer in identity protection," according to Documentary Magazine, and a brand new tool for documentary filmmakers. To protect the identities of the interviewees, they could not move the footage across the internet nor work on it in an open studio setting. Instead, they edited the film in a windowless room in order to keep with security protocols.

One of the refugees, Maxim Lapunov, is publicly identified in the film, as he sought, and failed, to get legal redress from Russian authorities.

The mysterious disappearance of gay Chechen singer Zelim Bakaev after a visit to Grozny for his sister's wedding in August 2017 also receives a brief mention in the film.

Release
The film premiered at the 2020 Sundance Film Festival, and screened at the 70th Berlin International Film Festival. It was released on June 30, 2020 by HBO Films.

It was shown at the Adelaide Film Festival in October 2020.

Reception
The website's critics consensus reads: "An illuminating and urgent call to action, Welcome to Chechnya portrays the horrors of the mass persecution of the LGBTQ+ community in the Chechen Republic with tenacity and tenderness." Metacritic, which uses a weighted average, assigned the film a score of 86 out of 100 based on 17 critics, indicating "universal acclaim".

Accolades

References

External links
 Official website
 Welcome to Chechnya at HBO
 

2020 documentary films
2020 films
2020 LGBT-related films
American documentary films
American LGBT-related films
Chechen-language films
Documentary films about violence against LGBT people
2020s English-language films
HBO documentary films
2020s Russian-language films
2020 multilingual films
American multilingual films
2020s American films